WhoSampled is a website and app database of information about sampled music or sample-based music, cover songs and remixes.

History 
Nadav Poraz founded the site in London, England in 2008, as a way to track musical samples and cover songs.  Mobile apps were released in 2012 and 2014 for iPhone and Android, respectively.  The website's database is user-generated and reviewed by moderators before the content goes live. As of 2023, the site's most sampled track is the Amen break from the Winstons, having been sampled in more than 6000 songs.  In 2015, the site added support for film and television clips.  The following year, it partnered with Spotify and introduced a six degrees of separation-inspired game that tracks relationships between artists, producers, and their tracks. In October 2017, WhoSampled partnered with KPM and Ableton and organised the third 'Samplethon' competition at Point Blank Studios in London.

See also 
 Interpolation (popular music)
 Discogs
 Pandora Radio
 SecondHandSongs

References

External links 
 
 
 

Online music and lyrics databases
Companies based in the London Borough of Tower Hamlets
Companies based in the London Borough of Hounslow
British music websites
Internet properties established in 2008
2008 establishments in England
Sampling (music)
Cover versions